Josef David Ossian Elgström (19 November 1883 – 20 May 1950) was a Swedish illustrator and writer.

Personal life
Born in Strövelstorp, Elgström was a brother of writer and visual artist Anna Lenah Elgström.

Career
Elgström studied at the Royal Swedish Academy of Arts from 1906 to 1907, and then with Kristian Zahrtmann in 1907 and with Christian Krohg in 1908. He contributed to the magazines Strix, Söndags-Nisse and Puck. He collected folkloristic material from Siberia, Greenland and Lappland, which he used in his books. Among his books are Lapska myther (1914), Lappalaiset (1919), and Karesuando-lapparna (1922). His work was also part of the painting event in the art competition at the 1936 Summer Olympics.

References

1883 births
1950 deaths
Swedish illustrators
Swedish male writers
People from Ängelholm Municipality
Swedish ethnologists
Olympic competitors in art competitions